In Greek mythology, Thalia or Thaleia ( or ; Ancient Greek: Θάλεια Tháleia "the joyous, the abundance") was one of the fifty Nereids, marine-nymph daughters of the 'Old Man of the Sea' Nereus and the Oceanid Doris. Her name was derived from θάλλειν thállein which means "to flourish, to be green".

Mythology 
Thaleia was mentioned as one of the 33 Nereids who gather on the coast of Troy from the depths of the sea to mourn with Thetis who cried out in sympathy for the grief of her son Achilles for his slain lover Patroclus in Homer's Iliad. 

In some accounts, Thalia, together with her sisters Cymodoce, Nesaea and Spio, was one of the nymphs in the train of Cyrene  Later on, these four together with their other sisters Thetis, Melite and Panopea, were able to help the hero Aeneas and his crew during a storm.

See also
Thalia (Muse)
Thalia (Grace)
Thalia (nymph)

Note

References 

 Grimal, Pierre, The Dictionary of Classical Mythology, Wiley-Blackwell, 1996, . "Thalia" 3. p. 442.
Homer, The Iliad with an English Translation by A.T. Murray, Ph.D. in two volumes. Cambridge, MA., Harvard University Press; London, William Heinemann, Ltd. 1924. Online version at the Perseus Digital Library.
Homer, Homeri Opera in five volumes. Oxford, Oxford University Press. 1920. Greek text available at the Perseus Digital Library.
Publius Vergilius Maro, Aeneid. Theodore C. Williams. trans. Boston. Houghton Mifflin Co. 1910. Online version at the Perseus Digital Library.
Publius Vergilius Maro, Bucolics, Aeneid, and Georgics. J. B. Greenough. Boston. Ginn & Co. 1900. Latin text available at the Perseus Digital Library.
Publius Vergilius Maro, Bucolics, Aeneid, and Georgics of Vergil. J. B. Greenough. Boston. Ginn & Co. 1900. Online version at the Perseus Digital Library.
Smith, William; Dictionary of Greek and Roman Biography and Mythology, London (1873). "Thaleia" 2.

Nereids
Deities in the Iliad

Deities in the Aeneid